The Taipei Music Center (TMC) is a performing arts and cultural venue in Nangang District, Taipei, Taiwan.

Overview
City officials announced plans on July 24, 2008 to conduct an international design competition for the facility in tandem with plans for the Taipei Performing Arts Center. In 2012, government officials announced that winner of the design competition was Reiser + Umemoto, RUR Architecture P.C., the New York City based American architectural firm represented by a joint collaboration between American architect Jesse A. Reiser and Japanese architect Nanako Umemoto, both well known in the architectural world for their innovative post-modernist aesthetic. The firm is particularly well known for its recently completed office tower, 0-14, in Dubai, United Arab Emirates. Construction began on 19 June 2013.

The center opened on September 5, 2020, before hosting the 31st Golden Melody Awards on October 3.

See also
 Music of Taiwan

References

External links

Taipei Music Center

Buildings and structures in Taipei
Concert halls in Taiwan
Postmodern architecture in Taiwan
Futurist architecture
2020 establishments in Taiwan
Event venues established in 2020